The Hazel Green Town Hall is a historic building in the village of Hazel Green, Wisconsin. Built in 1891, the building housed both the town clerk's office and the Hazel Green Opera House, a civic auditorium. The auditorium hosted town meetings, graduation ceremonies, religious events, and entertainers; it also served as the town's jail when necessary, as a cage could be added to the stage. The auditorium closed in the 1920s; the building is now private property.

The building was designed in the Boom Town style, which features a large facade in front of a smaller building. The facade has a tall bracketed cornice, while the building has a gable front.

The Hazel Green Town Hall was added to the National Register of Historic Places on January 26, 1989.

References

City and town halls on the National Register of Historic Places in Wisconsin
Government buildings completed in 1891
Music venues completed in 1891
Buildings and structures in Grant County, Wisconsin
1891 establishments in Wisconsin
National Register of Historic Places in Grant County, Wisconsin
City and town halls in Wisconsin